Lady Violet Diana Louise Manners (born 18 August 1993) is an English socialite, businesswoman, and model.

Life and career
She is the eldest child of David Manners, 11th Duke of Rutland and Emma Manners, Duchess of Rutland. Lady Violet studied at Queen Margaret's School, York.

She worked for My Beautiful City, a creative agency in Soho, before starting her own marketing and brand-strategy consultant company. She also has worked for Robin Birley, in public relations for Gleneagles, and a geopolitical consultant firm called Etoile.

Along with her sisters, Lady Alice and Lady Eliza, Lady Violet is known for her activities within the London social scene. She and her sisters have received national press for their outlandish behaviour, being dubbed the "bad-Manners girls." She has two younger brothers, Charles Manners, Marquess of Granby and Lord Hugo Manners. She has worked as a model, having been featured in Tatler and walking the runway for Dolce & Gabbana.

References

Living people
1993 births
Daughters of English dukes
Violet
English socialites
English female models
21st-century English businesswomen
21st-century English businesspeople
Fashion influencers
People educated at Queen Margaret's School, York
British women bloggers
Royalty and nobility models
English bloggers
People from Nottingham